This is a chronological list of highwaymen, land pirates, mail coach robbers, road agents, stagecoach robbers, and bushrangers active, along trails, roads, and highways, in Europe, North America, South America, Australia, Asia, and Africa, from ancient times to the 20th century, arranged by continent and country.

List

Europe

North America

South America

Australia

Asia

Further reading
 Ash, Russell (1970). Highwaymen, Shire Publications, ; revised edition (1994) 
 Brandon, David (2004). Stand and Deliver! A History of Highway Robbery, Sutton Publishing, 
 Dunford, Stephen (2000). The Irish Highwaymen, Merlin Publishing, 
 Haining, Peter (1991). The English Highwayman: A Legend Unmasked,  Robert Hale, 
 Harper, Charles George (1908). Half-hours with the Highwaymen: picturesque biographies and traditions of the "knights of the road", Chapman & Hall. Online edition, via Internet Archive.
 Pringle, Patrick (1951). Stand and Deliver: The Story of the Highwaymen, Museum Press, ASIN B0000CHVTK
 Seal, Graham (1996). The Outlaw Legend: a cultural tradition in Britain, America and Australia, Cambridge University Press,  (hbk),  (pbk)

External links
Stand and Deliver! History of Highwaymen and Highway Robbery

 
Highwaymen